Japan is the second-largest music market in the world and the following lists cover the top-selling albums in the country of Japan, based on information provided by the Recording Industry Association of Japan and Oricon Inc.

Best-selling physical albums in Japan
In the history of the Oricon weekly albums chart, which started in January 1970, only 280 out of all of the charting albums have sold more than one million copies, a feat mostly achieved by domestic acts.

List of best-selling albums by domestic acts
This is a list of the top-selling albums in Japan, based on data compiled by Oricon. Prior to January 1987, the domestic albums chart was separated into LPs (created in 1970), cassette tapes (introduced in 1974) and compact discs (launched in 1985), until their unification, which remains the current form. It is worth noting that Oricon only takes into consideration physical sales for its charts, meaning that digital purchases are excluded. The best-selling album is First Love (1999) by female solo artist Hikaru Utada, which sold over 7.5 million copies by the end of that year. Ryuichi Kawamura's Love (1997) topped the album chart with sales of 1,021,000 copies, making him the only male solo artist to have an album sell over one million copies in its first week in Oricon history. Love went on to sell 2,788,000 copies, and holds the record as the best-selling male solo album of all time. Whereas, Mr. Children's Atomic Heart (1994), still remains its position as the top-selling original studio album by a male band.

List of Million-certified albums by the Recording Industry Association of Japan
This is the list of the albums that have shipped over 1,000,000 copies and been certified Million by the Recording Industry Association of Japan (RIAJ). Albums are listed in alphabetical order of each recording artists' name.

Best-selling albums by year 
Sales figures derived from Oricon.

See also
 List of best-selling albums of the 1980s (Japan)
 RIAJ certification
 List of best-selling albums by country
 List of best-selling singles in Japan
 Oricon
 Oricon Singles Chart
 Oricon Albums Chart
 Big in Japan

References

External links
 Oricon official site

Japanese music-related lists
Japan